Big Apple Bagels is an American franchised chain of bakery-cafes based in Deerfield, Illinois. Coffee, along with a variety of other related products are sold. The products are sold as three different brands: Big Apple Bagels, Brewster's Coffee, and My Favorite Muffin.

Industry recognition
2003 Entrepreneur Magazine "Franchise 500"
2005 Entrepreneur Magazine "Best of the Best" Top Franchises
2010 GI Jobs, "Military Friendly Franchise"
2011 Restaurant Business Magazine "Top Future 50" Franchises

BAB, Inc.
BAB, Inc., the parent company of Big Apple Bagels, has 76 franchised and 4 licensed stores. Big Apple Bagels was started by Paul Stolzer in October 1993.  BAB completed its initial public offering November 27, 1995. BAB, Inc. has been a fundraiser of the Cystic Fibrosis Foundations since 2010.

Products available include sandwiches, soup, salads, bakery products, such as muffins and bagels, coffee, smoothies, frozen yogurt and pizza. There is also a line of breakfast sandwiches.

BAB, Inc. was formed to operate and franchise Big Apple Bagels locations. It expanded with a series of acquisitions:
1996 – Brewster's Coffee
1996 – Strathmore Bagels
1996 – Bagels Unlimited Inc.
1996 – Danville Bagels, Inc.
1997 – My Favorite Muffin
1999 – Jacobs Bros. Bagels

In addition to these acquisitions, in 2012 the company developed the SweetDuet Frozen Yogurt & Gourmet Muffin concept. This concept is meant to fuze self-serve frozen yogurt with My Favorite Muffin gourmet muffins.

References

External links
Big Apple Bagels
BAB, Inc.
Yahoo! Finance; BABB.OB

Bagel companies
Bakery cafés
Bakeries of the United States
Companies based in Deerfield, Illinois
Restaurants established in 1993
1993 establishments in Illinois
Companies traded over-the-counter in the United States
Coffeehouses and cafés in the United States